Cautires elegans is a species of beetles in the family Lycidae.

References

External links 

 Cautiresns elegans at insectoid.info

Lycidae